The 2022–23 Nebraska Cornhuskers men's basketball team represented the University of Nebraska–Lincoln in the 2022–23 NCAA Division I men's basketball season. The Cornhuskers were led by fourth-year head coach Fred Hoiberg and playe their home games at Pinnacle Bank Arena in Lincoln, Nebraska as members of the Big Ten Conference. They finished the season 16–16, 9–11 in Big Ten play to finish in a tie for 11th place. As the No. 11 seed in the Big Ten tournament, they lost to Minnesota in the first round.

Previous season
The Cornhuskers finished the 2021–22 season 10–22, 4–16 in Big Ten play to finish in a tie for last place. As the No. 13 seed in the Big Ten tournament, they lost in the first round Northwestern.

Offseason

Departures

Incoming transfers

2022 recruiting class

Roster

Schedule and results

|-
!colspan=9 style=|Exhibition

|-

|-
!colspan=9 style=|Regular Season

|-
!colspan=9 style=|Big Ten tournament

|-

References

Nebraska Cornhuskers men's basketball seasons
Nebraska
Nebraska Cornhuskers men's basketball
Nebraska Cornhuskers men's basketball